Ghazni, historically known as Ghaznain or Ghazna, also transliterated as Ghuznee, and anciently known as Alexandria in Opiana, is a city in southeastern Afghanistan with a population of around 190,000 people. The city is strategically located along Highway 1, which has served as the main road between Kabul and Kandahar for thousands of years. The name Ghazni drives from the Persian word ganj ‘treasure’.

Ghazni Citadel, the Minarets of Ghazni, the Palace of Sultan Mas'ud III, and several other cultural heritage sites have brought travelers and archeologists to the city for centuries. During the pre-Islamic period, the area was inhabited by various tribes who practiced different religions including Zoroastrianism, Buddhism and Hinduism. Arab Muslims introduced Islam to Ghazni in the 7th century and were followed in the 9th century by the Saffarids. Sabuktigin made Ghazni the capital of the Ghaznavid Empire in the 10th century. The city was destroyed by one of the Ghurid rulers but later rebuilt. It fell to several regional powers, including the Timurids and the Delhi Sultanate until it became part of the Hotaki dynasty, which was followed by the Durrani Empire or modern Afghanistan. During the First Anglo-Afghan War in the 19th century, the fortifications of Ghazni were partially demolished by British Indian forces.

In August 2018 the city became of the site of the Battle of Ghazni with the Taliban briefly occupying it and taking control of most of the surrounding area. On 12 August 2021, the city was captured by the Taliban as part of the 2021 Taliban offensive.

In 2013, ISESCO declared Ghazni the year's Islamic Capital of Culture.

History

The city was founded some time in antiquity as a small market town. It may be the Gazaca (Gázaca or Gāzaca) mentioned by Ptolemy, although he may have conflated it and the town of Ganzak (or Gazaka) in Iran.

In the 6th century BC, it was conquered by the Achaemenid king Cyrus II and incorporated into the Persian Empire. The city was subsequently incorporated into the empire of Alexander the Great in 329 BC, and called Alexandria in Opiana.
By the 7th century AD, the area was a major center of Buddhism. In 644, the Chinese pilgrim Xuanzang visited a city named Jaguda—which was almost certainly the contemporary name of the later Ghazni.

In 683, Arab armies brought Islam to the region. Yaqub Saffari from Zaranj conquered the city in the late 9th century. The Saffarids reduced the formerly Lawik dynasty to tributary status. In 962, the Turkic slave commander of the Samanid Empire, Alp-Tegin, attacked the city and besieged the Citadel of Ghazni for four months, wresting the city from Abu Bakr Lawik. Around 965, Abu Bakr Lawik recaptured Ghazni from Alp-Tegin's son, Abu Ishaq Ibrahim, forcing him to flee to Bukhara. However, this was not to last long because Abu Ishaq Ibrahim shortly returned to the town with Samanid aid, and took control of the town once again. For nearly two hundred years (977–1163), the city was the dazzling capital of the Ghaznavid Empire, which encompassed much of what is today Afghanistan, Turkmenistan, Pakistan, Eastern Iran and Rajasthan. The Ghaznavids took Islam to India and returned with fabulous riches looted from Hindu temples. Although the city was sacked in 1151 by the Ghorid Ala'uddin, it became their secondary capital in 1173, and subsequently flourished once again. Between 1215 and 1221, Ghazni was ruled by the Khwarezmid Empire, during which time it was destroyed by the Mongol armies of Genghis Khan's son Ögedei Khan.

In the first decades of the 11th century, Ghazni was the most important center of Persian literature. This was the result of the cultural policy of Sultan Mahmud (reigned 998–1030), who assembled a circle of scholars, philosophers, and poets around his throne in support of his claim to royal status in Iran.

The noted Moroccan travelling scholar, Ibn Battuta, visiting Ghazni in 1333, wrote:

Tamerlanes's grandson, Pir Muhammad bin Djinhangir, became the governor of Ghazni (along with Kabul and Kandahar) in 1401. Babur conquered the region in 1504 and personally thought that Ghazni was "a mean place" and pondered why any of the princes of the region would make it their seat of government. Ghazni stayed under Mughal control until 1738 when Iranian ruler Nader Shah invaded the area. After Nader Shah's death, Ghazni became part of the Durrani empire.

Ghazni City is famous for its Ghazni Minarets built on a stellar plan. They date from the middle of the twelfth century and are the surviving elements of the mosque of Bahramshah. Their sides are decorated with intricate geometric patterns. Some of the upper sections of the minarets have been damaged or destroyed. The most important mausoleum located in Ghazni City is that of Sultan Mahmud. Others include the Tombs of poets and scientists, such as the Tomb of Al Biruni. The only ruins in Old Ghazni retaining a semblance of architectural form are two towers, about 43 m (140 ft) high and 365 m (1,200 ft) apart. According to inscriptions, the towers were constructed by Mahmud of Ghazni and his son. For more than eight centuries the “Towers of Victory” monuments to Afghanistan's greatest empire have survived wars and invasions, the two toffee-colored minarets, adorned with terra-cotta tiles were raised in the early 12th century as monuments to the victories of the Afghan armies that built the empire. By the time the Ghurids had finalized the Ghaznavid removal from Ghazni, the city was a cultural center of the eastern Islamic world.

The Buddhist site at Ghazni is known as Tapar Sardar and consists of a stupa on a hilltop, surrounded by a row of smaller stupas. It is believed to have been built in the 8th century AD as part of a monastery complex. In the 1980s, a mud brick shelter was created to protect the sculpture, but the wood supports were stolen for firewood and the shelter partially collapsed. In 2001, the Taliban blew the Buddha up, believing it to be idolatrous.

During the First Anglo-Afghan War, the city was captured by British forces on 23 July 1839 in the Battle of Ghazni. The Civil war in Afghanistan and the continued conflict between the Taliban and the Northern Alliance during the 1990s put the relics of Ghazni in jeopardy. Ghazni's strategic position, both economically and militarily, assured its revival, albeit without its dazzling former grandeur. Through the centuries the city has figured prominently as the all-important key to the possession of Kabul.

After the 2001 U.S. invasion of Afghanistan, the United States armed forces built a base in Ghazni. They have been involved in rebuilding projects and protecting the local population against Taliban insurgents. In the meantime, they are also training the Afghan Local Police (ALP) Afghan National Police (ANP) and Afghan National Army (ANA). In 2010, the United States established the Lincoln Learning Center in Ghazni. The Lincoln learning centers in Afghanistan serve as programming platforms offering English language classes, library facilities, programming venues, Internet connectivity, educational and other counseling services. A goal of the program is to reach at least 4,000 Afghan citizens per month per location.

On 10 August 2018, the city was attacked by the Taliban during the Battle of Ghazni. Dozens of airstrikes were carried out in support of Afghan police and government forces and hundreds of Afghan soldiers, police, and Taliban insurgents were killed as well as dozens of civilians. In addition to the destruction and human suffering caused by the fighting, the Taliban also set fire to many buildings in the city.

On 18 May 2020, a suicide Humvee bomber affiliated with the Taliban killed nine Afghan intelligence personnel and injured 40 others at the National Directorate of Security (NDS) unit in Ghazni, also damaging the nearby Islamic Cultural Centre.

Ghazni was the tenth provincial capital of Afghanistan to be captured by the Taliban as part of the 2021 Taliban offensive.

Geography

Land Use 
Ghazni is a trading and transit hub in central Afghanistan. Agriculture is the dominant land use at 28%. In terms of built-up land area, vacant plots (33%) slightly outweigh residential area (31%). Districts 3 and 4 also have large institutional areas. The city has four police districts (nahia) and covers a total land area of 3,330 hectares. The total number of dwellings in Ghazni city is 15,931.

Climate 
Ghazni's climate is transitional between a cold semi-arid climate (Köppen climate classification BSk) and a hot-summer humid continental climate (Dsa). It has cold, snowy winters and warm, dry summers. Precipitation is low and mostly falls in winter (as snow) and spring (as rain).

Demography

The city of Ghazni's population surged from 143,379 in 2015 to 270,000 in 2018 as refugees from violent areas fled to the city. In 2015, there were 15,931 dwellings in Ghazni city.

The population is multi-ethnic, with approximately 50% being Tajik, 25% Hazara and 25% Pashtun.

Infrastructure

Transportation

In April 2012, Ghazni Governor Musa Khan Akbarzada laid the foundation stone of the Ghazni Airport. The work began later that year and was supervised by the managing director of the Ghazni province Engineer Ahmad Wali Tawakuli.

The city is next to Afghanistan's main highway that runs between Kabul and Kandahar in the south. There are roads leading to Gardez and in the east and other nearby villages as well as to towns in Hazarajat in the northwest.

Education

The city has a number of public schools. Jahan Maleeka School is an all-girls school with over 5,000 students and 150 teachers. Naswan Shaher Kohna School, another all-girls school, has over 3000 students. The Adult Literacy Rate as of 2012 accounted for 41.2% (2012).

Resources
Ghazni City is in an area of low rainfall.
In 2007, one of the gates on a 50-year-old dam on the Jikhai River broke, bringing up concerns among the inhabitants of Ghazni city about the water supply. The dam serves as a good source of irrigation water to Ghazni City and the surrounding agricultural areas. Nearby rivers have a history of flooding and causing severe damage and death, though efforts have begun to remedy this.

Sports
Professional sports teams from Ghazni

 Stadiums
 Ghazni Cricket Ground
 Ghazni Ground

Notable people

Rulers and emperors 

 Abu Bakr Lawik, ruler of Ghazni from the Lawik dynasty
 Abu Ali Lawik, son of Abu Bakr Lawik and ruler of the Lawik dynasty
 Sabuktigin, founder of the Ghaznavid dynasty
 Mahmud of Ghazni, son of Sabuktigin, first independent ruler of the dynasty of Ghaznavids in the 11th-century
 Muhammad of Ghazni, son of Mahmud of Ghazni and Sultan of the Ghaznavid empire
 Masʽud I of Ghazni, twin brother of Muhammad of Ghazni and Sultan of the Ghaznavid empire
 Mawdud of Ghazni, nephew of Muhammad of Ghazni and Sultan of the Ghaznavid empire
 Ibrahim of Ghazna, Sultan of the Ghaznavid empire
 Khusrau Malik, Sultan of the Ghaznavid empire
 Bahram-Shah of Ghazna, Sultan of the Ghaznavids empire
 Muhammad Shah, thirteenth Mughal emperor in the 18th-century

Politicians and military leaders 

 Alp-Tegin Turkic slave commander of the Samanid Empire, became later the semi-independent governor of Ghazni til his death in Ghazni
 Abu Ishaq Ibrahim of Ghazna, son of Alp-Tegin, Turkic officer and the Samanid governor of Ghazni
 Böritigin of Ghazni, Turkic officer and the Samanid governor of Ghazni
Ismail of Ghazni, son of Sabuktigin and brother of Mahmud, emir of Ghazna
 Ali ibn Ishak, financial minister of the Ghaznavids
 Abd al-Razzaq Maymandi, vizier of the Ghaznavid Sultan Mawdud Ghaznavi and Abd al-Rashid
Toghrul of Ghazna, Turkish slave general and usurper of the Ghaznavid throne 
 Azad Khan Afghan, Pashtun military commander from the 18th-century
 Nur Muhammad Taraki, former president of Afghanistan

Poets and scientists 

 Abu Rayhan Al-Biruni, famous 10/11th-century Iranian scholar and polymath, worked and died in Ghazni 
 Abu'l-Fadl Bayhaqi, 10/11th-century Persian secretary, historian and author at the court of the Ghazanvids, also died in Ghazni
 Asjadi, Persian royal poet at the court of the Ghaznavids in Ghazni
 Farrukhi Sistani, Persian royal poet at the court of the Ghaznavids, spent most of his life in Ghazni and also died there
 Manuchehri Dāmghānī, Persian royal poet at the court of the Ghaznavids in Ghazni, most probably died in Ghazni, too
 Unsuri Balkhi, Persian royal poet at the court of the Ghaznavids in Ghazni
 Hakim Sanai Ghaznavi, 11/12th-century Persian Sufi poet and mystic
 Hassan Ghaznavi, 12th-century Persian poet
 Faiz Mohammad Katib Hazara, 19/20th-century historian, writer and intellectual
 Abdul Rahman Pazhwak Afghan poet and diplomat
 Bhai Nand Lal Goya, court poet of the 10th Sikh Guru, Guru Gobind Singh

Religious leaders 
Shaykh Syed ʿAlī al-Hujwīrī, 11th-century Persian Sunni Muslim mystic, theologian, and preacher
 Jamal al-Din al-Ghaznawi, 12th-cenrtury Sunni Hanafi jurist, theologian, and Kalam scholar of the Maturidi school
 Pir Ghulam Mohiudin Ghaznavi (1902-1975), was an Islamic Sufi scholar. He was born in Ghazni and later went to Pakistan for business. He became a disciple of Pir Qasim Sadiq Mohrvi from Mohra Sharif and converted to Sufism and settled at Nerian Sharif Azad Kashmir Pakistan.
 Gholam Mohammad Niazi, Political Islamic movement thinker, Dean of the faculty of theology at Kabul University

Others 
 Abdul Ahad Mohmand first Afghan citizen and fourth Muslim to journey to outer space

Points of interest
 Citadel of Ghazni
 Minarets of Ghazni
 Palace of Sultan Mas'ud III
 Tomb of Sebuktigin
 Mausoleum of Sultan Mahmud
 Mausoleum of Sanai
 Museum of Islamic Art
 Tapa Sardar Excavations
Tomb of Al Biruni

Twin towns – sister cities
  Hayward, California, US
  Giżycko, Poland

See also
 Ghazni Province
 Mahmud of Ghazni
 Iconoclasm
 Ghaznavids
List of cities founded by Alexander the Great

References

Further reading
 Published in the 19th century
 
 

 Published in the 20th century

 Published in the 21st century
 
 
 Col James Tod's "Annals and Antiquities of Rajasthan" Vol. II, Annals of Jaisalmer, page 200,

External links

 Map of Ghazni district
 Ghazni.info
 Ghazni.org
 1911 encyclopedia entry
 
 
 

Cities in Afghanistan
Ghazni Province
Populated places in Ghazni Province
Provincial capitals in Afghanistan
Bactrian and Indian Hellenistic period
Populated places along the Silk Road
Cities in Central Asia
Archaeological sites in Afghanistan
Asian archaeology
Cities founded by Alexander the Great